Wang Nan (born October 23, 1978 in Fushun, Liaoning) is a female Chinese table tennis player from Liaoning. Wang remained as world #1 on the ITTF ranking system from January, 1999 to November, 2002. She is left-handed, and began playing table tennis when she was seven years old. Her particular skills are changing the placement of the ball during rallies and her loop drive, as well as her notable speed. Wang has been the leader of the women's table-tennis team of China after Deng Yaping's retirement. In terms of achievements, she is one of the most successful female table tennis players (alongside Li Xiaoxia, Deng Yaping, Ding Ning, Zhang Yining) having won the gold medal in each of the Table Tennis World Cup, the Table Tennis World Championships, and the Olympic Games.

Personal life 
Wang Nan is married to Guo Bin.

Career performance
In 1994 Wang Nan won the women's singles titles at the Swedish Open. The nex, Women's World Table Tennis Cup and Olympic Games. From 1997 to 1998 she won the Women's World Table Tennis Cup twice, as well as the American Open and China Open. At the 1998 Asian Games in Bangkok, Wang won the four gold medals on offer (singles, doubles, mixed doubles and women teams). At the end of 1998, she won the ITTF tour finals.

In 1999 she won the gold medal at the World Table Tennis Championships and the ITTF tour finals in both singles and doubles. She became world #1 in the same year. In the 2000 Summer Olympics in Sydney she won two gold medals in singles and doubles. Her excellent success record has resulted in her becoming a Grand-Slam champion.

However, in the 2002 Asian Games in Busan, she lost two finals in the singles and women's teams competitions, winning no gold medals. Many people criticized her attitude and observed that she was inactive and lacking confidence. A lot of rumors claimed that she was going to retire because her skills were depleted and she could not compete on the improving world stage.

Wang Nan attended 2003 World Table Tennis Championships in Paris. This is her fourth time representing China. She won three gold medals in singles, doubles and mixed doubles and of particular interest, she won both singles and doubles championship for the third time in a row, records which are hard to break in the future. Many people didn't expect her success before the competition began; however, the three gold medals proved that she was still one of the top players in the world.

At the 2004 Summer Olympics Wang Nan failed to retain her singles crown but went on to win the women's doubles with Zhang Yining.

Four years later at the 2008 Summer Olympics she made it to the Women's Final yet again, this time losing out to Zhang Yining, 8-11, 13–11, 11–8, 11–8, 11–3. She did, however, win the team gold for the host country.

Performance timelines

World Title Events Finals (24–6)

Team (8–0)

Singles (8–4)

Doubles (7–1)

Mixed Doubles (1–1)

Other significant finals

ITTF Pro Tour Grand Finals (7–3)

Singles: 4 (2–2)

Doubles: 6 (5–1)

Tournament of Champions (1–1)

Pro Tour Titles (37)

Team (3)

Singles (18)

Doubles (16)

References
 "Wang Nan, a true world class table tennis champion" TableTennisMaster.com

External links
 
 
 
 
 

1978 births
Living people
Olympic gold medalists for China
Olympic silver medalists for China
Olympic table tennis players of China
People from Fushun
Table tennis players at the 2000 Summer Olympics
Table tennis players at the 2004 Summer Olympics
Table tennis players at the 2008 Summer Olympics
Olympic medalists in table tennis
Asian Games medalists in table tennis
Table tennis players from Liaoning
Medalists at the 2008 Summer Olympics
Medalists at the 2004 Summer Olympics
Table tennis players at the 1998 Asian Games
Table tennis players at the 2002 Asian Games
Table tennis players at the 2006 Asian Games
Medalists at the 1998 Asian Games
Medalists at the 2002 Asian Games
Medalists at the 2006 Asian Games
Asian Games gold medalists for China
Asian Games silver medalists for China
Asian Games bronze medalists for China
Chinese female table tennis players
Medalists at the 2000 Summer Olympics